This is a list of patrol naval vessels of the Ottoman Navy:

Gunboats

Torpedo gunboat (Torpido gambotu)

Peleng-i Deryâ class

Şahin-i Deryâ

Gunboat (Gambot)

Akka class

Mûsul class

Sahir

İntibâh class

Saheddin

Aynalıkavak class

Rodos class

Fırat class

Nâsr-ü Hüdâ class

Nûr-ül Bâhir

Kastamonu class

Marmaris

Taşköprü class

Aydın Reis class

Îsâ Reis class

River Gunboat (Nehir Gambotu)

Doğan

Selmân-ı Pâk

Aviso (Avizo)

Talia

İzzeddin

Fuad

İsmail

Hanya

Kandiya

Arkadi

Resmo

Eser-i Nusret class

Taif class

Galata

Yacht (Yat)

Sultaniye

Süreyya

Şerifiye / Beylerbeyi

Şerifiye

Ertuğrul

Söğütlü

Şipka (armed yacht)

Trablus (armed yacht)

Survey vessel (Mesaha gemisi)

Beyrut

Q-ship

Dere

Guard vessel (Karakol gemisi)

Nûr-ül Bâhir

Rüsumat No 1

Rüsumat No 2

Rüsumat No 3

Rüsumat No 4

Rüsumat No 5

Aydın

Bahr-i Sefid

İskenderun

Sakız

Sources 

Naval ships of the Ottoman Empire
Lists of ships of the Ottoman Empire
Ottoman steam navy